Katamak or Katemak may refer to:
 Katamak, Hirmand
 Katamak, Zahedan